

Buildings and structures

 1680
 St Clement Danes, London, designed by Christopher Wren, is completed.
 Church of San Lorenzo, Turin, designed by Guarino Guarini, is substantially completed.
 Star Building at Windsor Castle and Cassiobury House in England, designed by Hugh May, are completed; and his work on St George's Hall, Windsor Castle, is beginning.
 1681
 Basilica of Santa Maria della Salute in Venice, designed by Baldassare Longhena in 1631, is dedicated.
 Sobieski Royal Chapel in Gdańsk, designed by Tylman van Gameren, is completed.
 Old Ship Church Puritan meeting house in Hingham, Massachusetts, which will become the oldest church building in continuous ecclesiastical use in the United States, is erected.
 Basilica of Our Lady of the Pillar in Zaragoza, Aragon, is begun to the design of Francisco Herrera the Younger (completed 1754).
 1682
 Abingdon County Hall in Oxfordshire, England, designed by Christopher Kempster, is completed.
 Tom Tower at Christ Church, Oxford, England, designed by Christopher Wren, is completed.
 College of Matrons in Salisbury, England, probably designed by Christopher Wren, is built.
 Khan al-Wazir in Aleppo is completed.

 1683
 The Old Ashmolean Museum in Oxford, probably designed by the mason Thomas Wood, is opened, the first purpose-built university museum (the modern day Museum of the History of Science).
 Ramsbury Manor in Wiltshire, England, designed by Robert Hooke, is completed (his Ragley Hall in Warwickshire is nearing completion at this time).
 Château de Dampierre in France, designed by Jules Hardouin Mansart, is completed.
 Église Saint-Thomas-d'Aquin (Paris), designed by Pierre Bullet, is consecrated.
 1684
 The Royal Hospital Kilmainham in Dublin, Ireland, designed by William Robinson, is completed as a home for retired soldiers.
 The Hall of Mirrors at the Palace of Versailles in France, designed by Jules Hardouin Mansart, is completed.
 The Château de Marly in the Marly-le-Roi commune is completed for Louis XIV.
 The Canal de l'Eure with its notable aqueduct, designed by the military engineer Lieutenant Général Vauban to serve Versailles for Louis XIV, is begun; work is abandoned about 1690.
 Middle Temple gateway, Fleet Street, London, designed by Roger North, is completed.
 The original Kaohsiung Confucius Temple is built.
 1685
 Ishak Pasha Palace in eastern Anatolia is begun.
 1686
 The Het Loo Palace at Apeldoorn in the Netherlands, designed by Jacob Roman and Johan van Swieten and begun in 1684, is completed; the garden is designed by Claude Desgotz.
 Kinross House in Scotland, designed by Sir William Bruce for himself, is begun.

 1687
 Neanderkirche in Düsseldorf (begun 1683) is completed.
 The rebuilding of Chatsworth House in Derbyshire, England, begins under William Talman.
 The Parthenon in Athens is extensively damaged in the Morean War.
 1688
 Belton House in Lincolnshire, England, perhaps designed by William Winde, is completed.
 Friends meeting house at Jordans, Buckinghamshire, England.
 1689
 Windsor Guildhall in Berkshire, England, designed by Sir Thomas Fitz (or Fiddes), is completed by Christopher Wren.
 Swallowfield Park, near Reading, Berkshire, England, is designed by William Talman.
 Bieliński Palace in Otwock Wielki, Poland, designed by Tylman van Gameren, is completed.
 Lubomirski bathing pavilion at Łazienki Palace, Warsaw, Poland, designed by Tylman van Gameren, is completed.

Events
 1682: October 27 – The city of Philadelphia, Pennsylvania is founded by William Penn, laid out on a grid pattern.
 1689: May – William Talman appointed Comptroller of the King's Works in England.

Births
 1682
 William Benson, English amateur architect and politician (died 1754)
 December 23 – James Gibbs, Scottish-born architect (died 1754)
 1683 – Thomas Ripley, English architect (died 1758)
 c. 1685 – William Kent, English architect and designer (died 1745)
 1686
 September 29 – Cosmas Damian Asam, German Baroque architect and painter (died 1739)
 Giacomo Leoni, Venetian-born architect (died 1746)
 1687: January 27? – Balthasar Neumann, German architect (died 1753)
 1689: October – William Adam, Scottish architect (died 1748)

Deaths
 1680: November 28 – Gian Lorenzo Bernini, Italian sculptor and architect (born 1598)
 1682: February 18 – Baldassare Longhena, Venetian Baroque architect (born 1598)
 1684
 February 20 – Roger Pratt, English gentleman architect (born 1620)
 February 21 – Hugh May, English architect (born 1620)
 1688: October 9 – Claude Perrault, French architect (born 1613)

References

Architecture